Sir Roger Antony Hornby (5 February 190420 December 1987), was senior partner at the stockbrokers Cazenove.

Early life
Roger Antony Hornby was born on 5 February 1904, the second son of St John Hornby and his wife Cicely Rachel Emily Barclay. He was educated at Sandroyd School. Winchester College and New College, Oxford.

Career
Hornby was a senior partner at Cazenove. According to Anthony Hilton, he rebuilt Cazenove after the war, by subtly acknowledging his company's place in the City hierarchy. They considered themselves the leading broker, so Hornby had a golden rule - any other broker had to visit them, but Cazeove always visited their merchant banker clients. And up until the 1970s, no member of staff could visit a merchant bank without wearing a bowler hat. He was knighted in 1960.

Hornby was also president of Savoy Hotel Ltd.

Personal life
Hornby married Lady Veronica Brenda Hamilton-Temple-Blackwood, daughter of Frederick Hamilton-Temple-Blackwood, 3rd Marquess of Dufferin and Ava, on 17 December 1931. They divorced in 1940.

Death
He died on 20 December 1987.

References

1904 births
1987 deaths
People educated at Sandroyd School
People educated at Winchester College
Alumni of New College, Oxford
British stockbrokers
Antony
20th-century British businesspeople